Protestant Theological University (abbreviated as PThU) is a theological university with locations in two Dutch cities: Amsterdam and Groningen. The Protestant Theological University primarily caters for ministerial education and as such is one of three institutes recognised by the PKN, but it is also possible to study general (Calvinist) theology without wishing to become a minister.

History
The university was founded in 1854 as the Theological School ("Theologische School") by the Christian Reformed Church in the Netherlands, a church resulting from a schism in 1834, to provide for theological education for its ministers. The name was changed to Theological College ("Theologische Hogeschool") in 1939 and finally to Theological University in 1986, after a reform in the Dutch university/polytechnic system.

In 1892, a large part of the Christian Reformed Church in the Netherlands merged with another group split from the mainstream Dutch Reformed Church to form the Reformed Churches in the Netherlands, which founded a new Calvinist university in Amsterdam: the Free University. This university also has a theological faculty, but the college at Kampen remained a separate institution.

In 1944, another schism within the Reformed Church in the Netherlands occurred, called the Liberation ("Vrijmaking"), which resulted in the Reformed Churches in the Netherlands (Liberated). This new church also had a need for its own ministerial education institute, and so a new university was founded from parts of the Theological University: Kampen Theological University of the Reformed Church (Liberated).

In 2010, the PThU moved from Kampen to Amsterdam and Groningen.

After the Reformed Church in the Netherlands merged with the Dutch Reformed Church and the Evangelical Lutheran Church in 2004 to form the Protestant Church in the Netherlands (PKN), the Protestant Theological University became part of the PKN. It is run on its behalf by a Board of Curators.

On 13 April 2022 the PThU announced its intention to move the university to Utrecht. On 21 April 2022, the general synod of the Protestant Church in the Netherlands (PKN) confirmed that decision. The PThU aims to start in Utrecht on 1 September 2024.

References

External links
www.pthu.nl

Protestant Theological University
Educational institutions established in 1854
1854 establishments in the Netherlands
Education in Overijssel
Kampen, Overijssel
Protestant universities and colleges in Europe
Seminaries and theological colleges in the Netherlands